Frederick Campbell Colston (January 25, 1884 – November 19, 1918) was an American tennis player active in the early 20th century.

Colston served as a captain in the 155st Field Artillery Brigade, 80th Division, American Expeditionary Forces during World War I. He died near Verdun, France eight days after the war ended. His is buried at the American Cemetery at Romagne-sous-Montfaucon, Lorraine, France.

Career
Colston reached the semifinals of the U.S. National Championships in 1910.

Grand Slam tournament performance timeline

References

American male tennis players
1884 births
1918 deaths
Sportspeople from Baltimore
Tennis people from Maryland
American military personnel killed in World War I